Joseph Oscar Scott, Jr. (March 17, 1926 – June 30, 2016) was an American football player who played running back for six seasons for the New York Giants. He was born in Murchison, Texas and died in Athens, Texas where he lived in 2016.

See also
Joe Scott Statistics

References

1926 births
2016 deaths
People from Henderson County, Texas
Players of American football from Texas
American football running backs
San Francisco Dons football players
New York Giants players
People from Athens, Texas